is a railway station in the city of Higashimatsushima, Miyagi Prefecture, Japan, operated by East Japan Railway Company (JR East).

Lines
Rikuzen-Ono Station is served by the Senseki Line. It is located 36.0 rail kilometers from the terminus of the Senseki Line at Aoba-dōri Station.

Station layout
The station has one island platform serving two tracks, connected to the station building by a level crossing. The station is unattended.

Platforms

History
Rikuzen-Ono Station opened on April 10, 1928, as a station on the Miyagi Electric Railway.  The Miyagi Electric Railway was nationalized on May 1, 1944. The station was absorbed into the JR East network upon the privatization of JNR on April 1, 1987.

The station was closed from March 11, 2011 due to damage to the line associated with the 2011 Tōhoku earthquake and tsunami, and services were replaced by provisional bus services. Services in the direction of Sendai were resumed on May 30, 2015.

Passenger statistics
In fiscal 2018, the station was used by an average of 345 passengers daily (boarding passengers only).

Surrounding area

See also
 List of railway stations in Japan

References

External links

 

Railway stations in Miyagi Prefecture
Senseki Line
Railway stations in Japan opened in 1928
Higashimatsushima, Miyagi
Stations of East Japan Railway Company